Henry Irven "Hank" Arft (January 28, 1922 – December 14, 2002), nicknamed "Bow Wow", was a Major League Baseball player.

Career
He died of cancer at the age of 80 years.

References

Further reading
 Staff (November 4, 1947). "Hank Arft of Springfield Captures Official Batting Crown in Three-I with .366". The Davenport Daily Times. p. 19
 Staff (November 11, 1947). "Henry Arft Promoted to San Antonio Club". The St. Louis Star and Times. p. 21
 Staff (September 11, 1963). "At Old Timers Night". St. Louis Globe-Democrat. p. 21
 Brisbane, Arthur S. (August 12, 1981). "Softball reunion was no dog". The Kansas City Times. p. 5
 Staff (December 15, 2002). "Henry I. Arft; Co-owned Schrader Funeral Home". St. Louis Post-Dispatch. p. 56

External links
Baseball-Reference page
Hank Arft statistics

Major League Baseball first basemen
St. Louis Browns players
Baseball players from Missouri
1922 births
2002 deaths